Venmani S. Selvanather (6 July 1913 – 14 October 1993) was an Indian prelate of the Roman Catholic Church. He was the Archbishop of the Archdiocese of Pondicherry and Cuddalore from 1973 to 1992, succeeding Ambrose Rayappan. He founded several initiatives in the educational and social service field.

Career
Selvanather was born at Tiruchengode, Tamil Nadu. He was ordained as a priest for the Diocese of Salem on 26 October 1941. He was appointed Bishop of Salem on 3 March 1949. He was consecrated by Bishop Henri-Aimé-Anatole Prunier on 1 May 1949. He was the Bishop of Salem from 1949 to 1973 and participated in Second Vatican Council as a Council Father. He was appointed as Archbishop in 1973, retiring on 24 June 1992. He was succeeded by Archbishop Michael Augustine as Archbishop of Pondicherry and Cuddalore. He died on 14 October 1993.

Archbishop
As Archbishop, Selvanather was responsible for the establishment of Pondicherry Multipurpose Social Service Society (PMSSS) and South Arcot Multipurpose Social Service Society (SAMSSS). He started St.Joseph’s College of Arts & Science and St.John’s College Seminary at Cuddalore. He also started Pope John Paul II College of Education at Pondicherry.

References

 

20th-century Roman Catholic archbishops in India
Roman Catholic archbishops of Pondicherry and Cuddalore
1913 births
1993 deaths
Participants in the Second Vatican Council
Indian Roman Catholic archbishops